Class 24 may refer to:

24-class sloop, Royal Navy minesweeper
British Rail Class 24, British diesel-electric locomotive
DRG Class 24, German 2-4-0 steam locomotive
GER Class R24, British 0-6-0 steam locomotive
J/24, sailing boat
L&YR Class 24, British 0-6-0T steam locomotive
NER Class P, later LNER Class J24, British 0-6-0 steam locomotive
New South Wales Z24 class locomotive, Australian 2-6-0 steam locomotive
South African Class 24 2-8-4, South African steam locomotive